Cacamacihuatl was a Queen of Tenochtitlan as a wife of the King Huitzilihuitl. She was a mother of Prince Tlacaelel I (she bore him 1397 or 1398) and grandmother of Cacamatzin and Tlilpotoncatzin.

Family

See also

List of Tenochtitlan rulers
Ayauhcihuatl

Notes

External links

Tenochca nobility
Queens of Tenochtitlan
Nobility of the Americas